The Preclassic or Formative Period of Belizean, Mayan, and Mesoamerican history began with the Mayan development of ceramics during 2000 BC900 BC, and ended with the advent of Mayan monumental inscriptions in 250 AD.

Geography 
During the pre-Columbian era, Belize formed part of Mesoamerica. Traditionally, the first-order subdivisions of the latter follow cultural or political boundaries of Preclassic, Classic, or Postclassic civilisations, eg Mayans and Aztecs. The Mayan region of Mesoamerica is one such. It, in turn, is further subdivided physiographically into at least three regions, ie the Mayan Lowlands, Highlands, and Pacific. The first of these second-order subdivisions, which fully encompassed Belize, is still further subdivided into northern, central, and southern portions, called the Northern, Central, and Southern Lowlands. Belizean territory north of Indian Creek ie Nim Li Punit is often included within the Central Lowlands, fully encompassing five of Belize's districts, and an upper portion of Toledo. Territory south of Indian Creek, including Nim Li Punit, is often placed within the Southern Lowlands, encompassing the central and lower portions of Toledo.

Climate 
It has been suggested that a global climatic drying event may have prompted the development of ceramics, monumental structures, and farming across the Mayan region of Mesoamerica during 1200 BC900 BC.

Demographics 
The ancestral homeland or urheimat of Mayan speakers, ie of Proto-Mayans, is most often located either near Soloma, in the southwestern highlands ie Sierra Cuchumatanes of Huehuetenango, Guatemala, or in the El Quiche valley, in the central lowlands of Quiché, Guatemala. However, details of proto-Mayan or Mayan emigration from urheimat into the rest of the Mayan region of Mesoamerica remain uncertain. Generally, though, it is thought that proto-Mayans remained in urheimat, with only their Mayan descendants emigrating abroad. For instance, Yukatekan speakers, who are thought to have diverged from proto-Mayan speakers in circa 1900 BC, are not thought to have emigrated from urheimat until several centuries after divergence.

The first Mayan settlers of the Lowlands are thought to have co-inhabited said region with pre-existing non-Mayan settlers, eg Palaeoindians, Xincans, Lenkans, and Tols or Jicaques. However, details of their interactions with these pre-existing settlers remain unclear. In central and southern Belize, the disappearance of lithic technology around 1900 BC has been taken as evidence that Mayan settlers replaced or displaced pre-existing Palaeoindian ones. However, in northern Belize, particularly given Preceramic and Preclassic lithic technology at Colha, it has been suggested that Palaeoindian and Mayan settlers co-inhabited the region.

Technology

Ceramic 
It is uncertain whether the earliest ceramic traditions ie complexes of the Lowlands were foreign imports or local innovations. It has been suggested that all early ceramic complexes of Belize and the surrounding Lowlands were indigenous developments with few or no connections to previously existing traditions outside the Mayan region. However, it has also been suggested that some of these, ie the Cunil and Jenney Creek complexes of the Upper Belize River Valley, were developed by MixeZoquean speakers of Honduras and subsequently imported. By the Middle Preclassic, however, population growth and interaction lead to the harmonisation of ceramic traditions. The first widespread ceramic tradition is thought to be Mamon, characterised by red-slipped or Juventud Red bowls, and commonly dated to 600 BC.

The earliest pre-Mamon ceramic traditions in Belize and surrounding Lowlands are most often dated to at least 1000 BC, though there is still much debate regarding details. Pre-Mamon ceramic complexes have been discovered in Cuello and Cahal Pech, and more recently in Colha, Blackman Eddy, and Xunantunich. Finely-made tecomates and non-utilitarian ceramics, especially figurines and ocarinas, appear upon the advent of non-nomadic hamlets in Belize and surrounding Lowlands. These are taken as indicative of increasing socioeconomic complexity, as they are believed to have been employed in symbolic or ritual functions, like feasts and burials.

Lithic 
The use of Preceramic lithic tools continued into the Preclassic. Colha, for instance, is known to have produced and distributed burin-spall drills, macroblades, bifacial celts, wedge-form adzes, T-shaped adzes, and constricted unifaces throughout northern and central Belize. A lack of standardised forms, and absence of identifiable workshops, have been taken to suggest that lithic tool production was organised as a cottage industry, with manufacturing based within residences, alongside other domestic activities. The production of bifaces and adzes has been taken as indicative of 'an increased need for tools used for land clearance and field maintenance associated with horticulture.'

Exotic 
Preclassic shell beads and other ornaments have been excavated at sites in northern and central Belize, including Colha, Blackman Eddy, K'axob, and Pacbitun. As marine shell beads have also been excavated at Preclassic settlements further inland, like Tikal and Seibal in Guatemala, it is thought that at least some of their production in Belize was destined for long-distance trade. The Preclassic further saw the development of greenstone and obsidian tools and ritual artefacts, and cotton textiles. Greenstone polished celts, beads, and triangulates have been recovered in sites across the country. The earliest obsidian tools, appearing first as hard-hammer flakes, then as prismatic blades, were introduced in circa 1000 BC, with raw or worked obsidian likely sourced from the Guatemalan Highlands. Preceramic floral remains indicate the presence of cotton in northern and central Belize by 2200 cal BC1000 cal BC, to which period are dated ceramic spindle whorls and bone needles recovered from the same regions. Additionally, plaster with a textile impression recovered from Cahal Pech, thought to date to 1200 cal BC900 cal BC, revealed that the impressed 'fabric was constructed of single-ply yarns with a Z-twist.'

The appearance of exotic goods, particularly in dedicatory and terminatory deposits or caches across Belize and the surrounding Lowlands, is often taken to signal an increase in socioeconomic complexity, social inequality, and power among an emerging elite class.

Economy

Agriculture 
Preclassic floral remains provide evidence of increasing deforestation and development of slash-and-burn milpas or farms in Belize and the wider Mayan Lowlands, with maize, cassava, beans, chili peppers, calabash, and squash as main cultivars. The intensification of agriculture during the Preclassic necessitated extensive landscaping beyond forest clearance, including the construction of canals, raised fields, and terraces. These features have proven difficult to date, though their first appearance in northern Belize is thought to date to circa 1000 BC.

Trade 
Settlements in Belize and the surrounding Lowlands are thought to have engaged in long-distance, riverine or overland trade, particularly in tools and ritual artefacts of exotic materials like marine shells, greenstone, and obsidian. For instance, Cahal Pech is thought to have begun importing exotic goods from outside the Lowlands as early as 1200 cal BC900 cal BC, including obsidian from the Highlands, greenstone from the Motagua Valley in southeastern Guatemala, and queen conch shells from coastal Caribbean settlements. Northern Belize, particularly Colha, is thought to have engaged in short-distance trade ie trade within the Lowlands, particularly in lithic tools.

Society

Language 
The ancestral form of all Mayan languages is called proto-Mayan. Its history, phonology, syntax, grammar, and lexicon have been studied since at least the 1960s, and 'have now been worked out in great detail.' It is thought to have been in close contact with proto-MijeSokean, a language most often associated with the Locona people of the Gulf, Isthmus, and Soconusco regions of Mesoamerica, given that later Mayan languages exhibit loanwords of proto-MijeSokean origin.

The divergence of proto-Mayan into distinct Mayan languages is most commonly dated to circa 2200 BC. This date, however, was obtained from glottochronological analysis, a linguistic tool which is 'now largely abandoned, given its many difficulties and its uncorroborated founding assumptions.' More recent attempts to date the divergence have employed disparate methods, and yielded widely disparate results, ranging from circa 6600 BC to circa 209 BC.

Arts and sciences 
The Late Preclassic saw the adoption or diffusion of various arts and sciences across the Lowlands, including hieroglyphic script writing, vigesimal arithmetic, and Long Count calendar time-keeping. Furthermore, during this sub-period, non-hieroglyphic artistic illustrations and portrayals increasingly tended towards a characteristically distinct Mayan style. These developments have been described as 'the first blossoming of what is often called civilisation.' Notably, the introduction of mathematical zero during this sub-period has been deemed 'the earliest known instance of this concept.'

Culture 
The Preclassic is generally characterised by increasing socioeconomic and ideological complexity in Belize and surrounding Lowlands. Details of the increase in social complexity and inequality in the Early to Middle Preclassic have proven difficult to ascertain, though broad strokes are often gleaned from architecture, burials, and material culture. For instance, the period saw the production and long-distance trade of non-functional, exotic goods, of ceramic, marine shells, greenstone, and obsidian, employed in increasingly standardised rituals, such as feasts and burials.

Mortuary 
Mortuary practices are thought to have become increasingly more complex, standardised, and public throughout the Preclassic. Grave goods, often ceramic and shell artefacts, eg carved jute snail-shells, have been excavated in early burials, which are first documented as simple pits or cist graves below private residences, and later as public interments in round structures, E-Groups, and platforms. At Cuello, Middle Preclassic burials dated to circa 900 BC600 BC, particularly graves of children, have been found with exotic items of ceramic, marine shell, and greenstone. Wealthier graves first appear by the end of the Middle Preclassic, including, for instance, graves unearthed at Cahal Pech with jade, slate plaques, drilled animal teeth, marine shell discs, and ceramic figurines.

Infrastructural 
Similarly, infrastructure in settled hamlets is thought to have become more complex and public throughout the period. Early specialised structures, dated to circa 900 BC, have been excavated at Cahal Pech, Cuello, and Blackman Eddy, with the uncovered sweathouse in Cuello being the earliest known instance in the Lowlands. Further afield, ball courts and temple complexes dated to 1000400 BC have been unearthed 'at some two dozen sites in northwestern Yucatan.' It has been suggested that wealthy or elite individuals, at least in central Belize, may have appropriated iconographic motifs common in Cunil pottery 'to demonstrate special knowledge of a sacred cosmos,' and to sponsor the construction of ceremonial architecture, trade in exotic goods, and the celebration of public rituals, leading to an increasingly socioeconomically-stratified society. At Blackman Eddy, the appearance of a sizeable midden with tens of thousands of freshwater shells, and finely-decorated ceramic wares, has been taken as possible evidence of feasting.

Cuisine 
Maize, an established staple in Belize and the Lowlands by the onset of the Preclassic, is thought to have been boiled and treated with lime to make nixtamal ie hominy. Preclassic Mayan settlers, however, did not exclusively rely on farmed produce like maize, beans, and squash, as game and foraged goods have been documented across northern and central Belize, including craboo, hogplum, guava, soursop, cassava, sweet potato, cacao, deer, dogs, peccary, armadillo, agouti, rabbits, turtles, birds, reptiles, fish, and molluscs. Generally though, Preclassic Mayan cuisine in the Lowlands is thought to have focussed less on large game, compared to the Preceramic Palaeoindian diet, and more on smaller domesticated animals, ie dogs and turkeys, and foraged marine molluscs, eg jute snails.

Government 
The earliest (Early to Middle Preclassic) non-nomadic settlements across the Lowlands are thought to have been 'initially organised into autonomous egalitarian communities.' Little beyond this, however, is known. It has nonetheless been suggested that during circa 800400 BC 'a number of emerging polity capitals jockeyed for power and advantage across the Maya lowlands,' with Nakbe (in the El Mirador Basin, Guatemala) noted as a likely example of such an emerging capital. This shift from single-hamlet polities towards multi-hamlet states ruled by a dominant capital becomes particularly noticeable during the Late Preclassic, with El Mirador (likewise in the El Mirador Basin) noted as the pre-eminent example of such a capital. These capitals' authority over their neighbouring settlements is thought to have been cemented, at least in part, by their increasing monopoly of long-distance trade in exotic goods (which noticeably expanded in reach and volume during this sub-period), and by their coercion, co-option, or provision of labour and resources for the construction of public infrastructure (which became noticeably monumental during this sub-period).

Some or many of these multi-settlement polities are thought to have been ruled by sovereigns, including or especially divine kings, together with subordinate courts or privy councils, from their respective capitals. Late Preclassic evidence of monarchical constitutions exists, at least, for states ruled by Cerros, El Mirador, Tikal, San Bartolo, and Uaxactun, while earlier Middle Preclassic evidence may exist, at least, for the state ruled by Nakbe. It has been further suggested that this monarchical 'tradition of rulership probably originated in the Middle Preclassic and is associated with the central Maya lowlands, as at Nakbe, and became fully developed in the Late Preclassic at El Mirador.'

Warfare 
At least some warfare is thought to have attended the emergence of multi-settlement polities during the Middle Preclassic. The scarce available evidence from this sub-period 'points to sporadic, small-scale raiding between polities.' These sporadic attacks are thought to have become more widespread or intense towards the Late Preclassic, as surviving evidence of these later battles 'becomes far more certain.'

Sites 

The Preclassic is characterised by a move away from rockshelters to permanent settlements. Residential and ceremonial structures generally 'appear quite simple in design and construction.' Bedrock-embedded postholes, atop tamped floors or low earth-and-marl platforms, indicating apsidal pole-and-thatch houses, have been excavated in northern and central Belize. Fragments of pole-impressed daub walls, clay-lined hearths, low stone-retaining walls, and plastered architecture and platforms, demonstrating increasing investment in living and ceremonial spaces, and increasing social and ceremonial complexity, have also been unearthed. Public, ceremonial, or monumental structures in Cerros, Colha, Cuello, Lamanai, and Nohmul have been dated or tentatively dated to the Preclassic.

Timeline

Scholarship 
The earliest amateur work on Mayan sites in Belize, possibly Preclassic ones, is attributed to George Henderson, a Bayman, who in 1809 published 'a tantalisingly short description of mounds along the Belize River.' Site-focussed excavations were begun by Thomas Gann in 1894, and presented to the Society of Antiquaries of London on 16 May 1895. However, 'the rudimentary beginnings of archaeological research were not followed by similar efforts in Belize for a good many years,' ie until 19251939 work by the British Museum, the Carnegie Institution, Field Museum, and J. E. S. Thompson, among others.

The earliest significant work on the Preclassic ceramics of Belize is thought to be the 1977 PhD thesis by Duncan Pring for the University of London. Ceramic data from Cuello, in particular, 'have played a significant role in our understanding of Early Middle Preclassic pottery in northern Belize.' Colha ceramics, additionally, have been identified as promising, given the site's Preceramic activity and possible occupation.

See also 
 Pre-Columbian Belize
 Preclassic Period in the Mayan region of Mesoamerica
 Preclassic Period in Mesoamerica
 Formative stage in the Americas

Notes and references

Explanatory footnotes

Short citations

References

Journals

Theses

Print

Other 

 

History of Belize by period
History of the Yucatán Peninsula
History of Mesoamerica
Maya Preclassic Period
Formative period in the Americas